Tadesse Getahon (born 20 December 1997) is an Israeli long-distance runner.

Career 

In 2017, he competed in the men's 10,000 metres event at the European Athletics U23 Championships held in Bydgoszcz, Poland.

Two years later, in 2019, he won the silver medal in the men's 10,000 metres event at the European Athletics U23 Championships held in Gävle, Sweden. He also finished in 4th place in the men's 5000 metres event.

In 2020, he competed in the men's race at the World Athletics Half Marathon Championships held in Gdynia, Poland.

Achievements

References

External links 
 

Living people
1997 births
Place of birth missing (living people)
Israeli male long-distance runners
21st-century Israeli people